Gorantha Deepam is a 1978 Telugu-language drama film from the writer-director duo of Ramana and Bapu. The film stars Sreedhar, Vanisri and Mohan Babu.

Plot
A young bride, Padmavathi (Vanisri) is sent to her new home with instructions of treating her husband as a father, god, teacher and so on. However, she faces a difficult situation with her exploitative mother-in-law, uncaring husband (Sridhar), and a family friend (Mohan Babu) who tries to rape her. How her virtuousness transforms everyone forms the rest of the story.

Soundtrack

References

External links

1978 films
Films directed by Bapu
Films with screenplays by Mullapudi Venkata Ramana
Indian drama films
Films scored by K. V. Mahadevan
1970s Telugu-language films